The USA Half Marathon Championships is the annual national championships for half marathon running in the United States. The race serves as a way of designating the American national champion for the half marathon. The men's race was first contested in 1987 and the women's race began in 1989.

Men's results

Women's results

Records

See also
USA Marathon Championships
USA Cross Country Championships
USA Outdoor Track and Field Championships
USA Indoor Track and Field Championships

References
USA Champions Men's Half Marathon. USATF. Retrieved on 2014-07-08
USA Champions Women's Half Marathon. USATF. Retrieved on 2014-07-08

External links
USA Track and Field website
Official website at runnerspace.com

Half Marathon
Half Marathon
Half marathons in the United States
Recurring sporting events established in 1987